FC Chernolomets is a Bulgarian football club based in Popovo, that competes in the North-East Third League, the third tier of Bulgarian football.

The club was founded in 1919. In 1946, they contested the Bulgarian Cup Final for the only time in their history, losing 4–1 to Levski Sofia.

Honours
Bulgarian Cup
 Runners-up: 1946

Current squad

League positions

References

External links
 Chernolomets Popovo at Bulgarian Club Directory

Chernolomets
1919 establishments in Bulgaria
Association football clubs established in 1919